"Workin' On a Groovy Thing" is a song written by Neil Sedaka and Roger Atkins which had its highest profile as a 1969 hit single by the 5th Dimension.

The song was first recorded by R&B songstress Patti Drew  for  her 1968 album Workin' on a Groovy Thing and released as a single to reach #34 on the U.S. R&B chart while crossing-over to #62 on the Billboard Hot 100 and reaching #86 in Canada. Future Steam frontman Garrett Scott - working with producer Paul Leka -  and the 5th Dimension cut versions of the song in the summer of 1969, with the 5th Dimension's version - released a week before Scott's - reachin #20 on the Billboard Hot 100, #9 on the U.S. adult contemporary chart, and #15 on the U.S. R&B chart. Internationally the 5th Dimension version reached #17 in Canada, and #48 in Australia in 1969. Produced by Bones Howe and arranged by Bill Holman, Bob Alcivar, and Howe,"Workin' on a Groovy Thing" was included on the 1969 5th Dimension album, The Age of Aquarius.  

"Workin' on a Groovy Thing" has also been recorded by Lana Cantrell (album Lana!/ 1968), Allison Durbin (album I Have Loved Me a Man/ 1968), Barbara Lewis (album Workin' on a Groovy Thing/ 1968), Allison Durbin (album I Have Loved Me a Man/ 1968), Friends of Distinction (album Highly Distinct/ 1969), Neil Sedaka (album, Workin' on a Groovy Thing/ 1969),, and Alton Ellis (1972). Instrumental versions of the song include those by Richard Holmes (album Workin' on a Groovy Thing/ 1969), Phil Moore (album Right On/ 1969), David Rose (album Happy Heart/ 1969), Mongo Santamaria (album Workin' on a Groovy Thing/ 1969), Bola Sete (album, Workin' on a Groovy Thing/ 1970), and Johnny Hammond (album/ Breakout/ 1971).

The song was performed on the 1973 episode of The Partridge Family sitcom called "Maid in San Pueblo" but the Partridge Family version has never been released.

Chart history - 5th Dimension version

References

1968 songs
1968 singles
1969 singles
Songs written by Neil Sedaka
Neil Sedaka songs
The 5th Dimension songs
Capitol Records singles
Song recordings produced by Bones Howe
Songs written by Roger Atkins